Tragedy Spring is a small alpine freshwater spring and historical site in eastern Amador County, California adjacent to Highway 88 approximately two miles west of Silver Lake. It was named after an incident on June 27, 1848, in which three Mormon men were killed adjacent to the spring, allegedly by Native Americans, and their bodies burned and buried. The names of the men were carved on a large tree in this location. The men killed were Henderson Cox (1829-1848), Ezra Hela Allen (1814-1848), and Daniel Browett (1809-1848).

History

In 1848 a company of Mormons, some of whom had served in the Mexican–American War as part of the Mormon Battalion, were planning to leave the recently discovered gold fields near Placerville to join the new Mormon colony at Salt Lake City, Utah. Daniel Browett, president and lead scout of the Browett-Holmes Company, decided to ride out with two companions and scout snow conditions and a possible route over the Sierra Nevada against the advice of the rest of the company. When the scouts hadn't returned by July 5, a party of 10 went in search of them without success. On July 19, the main group, now on its way to Utah, arrived at the spring and found a freshly dug shallow grave with broken arrows lying about. Upon investigation, they found their scouts' bodies in the grave, whereupon they named the spring "Tragedy." The victims had been stripped, mutilated and robbed, according to journal accounts.

The route taken by the Mormon group out of California became known as the Carson River Trail, or Carson Trail, and it was to become one of the primary routes used by immigrants coming into California in search of gold.

Memorial
The Tragedy Spring picnic ground, maintained by Eldorado National Forest, is located at the gravesite. It is situated on a hillside near the entrance to the picnic site. The grave is a rock cairn that has been cemented in place with an attached plaque commemorating the loss of the three men, Henderson Cox (1829-1848), Ezra Hela Allen (1814-1848) and Daniel Browett (1809-1848).  The burial site became a Daughters of Utah Pioneers monument in 1967.

References

Mormon Battalion
History of Amador County, California